Phoxocephalidae is a family of small, shrimp-like crustaceans in the suborder Gammaridea described by Georg Ossian Sars in 1891. It contains Cocoharpinia iliffei, a critically endangered species on the IUCN Red List.

Genera:

References

External links 
 Revisionary Notes on the Phoxocephalidae (Amphipoda), with a Key to the General

Gammaridea
Crustacean families